Prison Farm is a 1938 American crime film directed by Louis King, and written by Eddie Welch, Robert Yost and Stuart Anthony. It stars Shirley Ross, Lloyd Nolan, John Howard, J. Carrol Naish, Porter Hall, Esther Dale and May Boley. It was William Holden’s film debut. The film was released on June 17, 1938.

Plot
Jean Forest gets in a relationship with criminal Larry Harrison, even though she is advised not to, he wants to elope to Canada and Jean gives up her job to go with him. On the way they are arrested for a small crime and Harrison pleads guilty in hope of going to a local farm prison, but it turns out to be a brutal penal colony.

Cast
Shirley Ross as Jean Forest
Lloyd Nolan as Larry Harrison
John Howard as Dr. Roi Conrad
J. Carrol Naish as Noel Haskins
Porter Hall as Chiston R. Bradby
Esther Dale as Cora Waxley
May Boley as 'Shifty' Sue
Marjorie Main as Matron Brand
Anna Q. Nilsson as Matron Ames
John Hart as 'Texas' Jack
William Holden as Prisoner (uncredited)

References

External links 
 

1938 films
1938 crime films
American black-and-white films
American crime films
Films directed by Louis King
Paramount Pictures films
American prison films
1930s English-language films
1930s American films